Hanford  is one of the 31 constituencies in the Tuen Mun District.

Created for the 2003 District Council elections, the constituency returns one district councillor to the Tuen Mun District Council, with an election every four years.

Hanford loosely covers areas surrounding Hanford Garden, Seaview Garden and Aegean Coast in Tuen Mun with an estimated population of 14,473.

Councillors represented

Election results

2010s

2000s

References

Tuen Mun
Constituencies of Hong Kong
Constituencies of Tuen Mun District Council
2003 establishments in Hong Kong
Constituencies established in 2003